Fragments is the seventh studio album by British musician Bonobo. It was released on 14 January 2022 under Ninja Tune and was nominated for Best Dance/Electronic Album for the 65th Grammy Awards.

Track listing

Charts

References

External links
Fragments on SoundCloud
Fragments on Spotify

Bonobo (musician) albums
2022 albums